Plešanci is a village in the municipality of Probištip, North Macedonia.

Demographics
According to the 2002 census, the village had a total of 168 inhabitants. Ethnic groups in the village include:

Macedonians 168

References

Villages in Probištip Municipality